The Parfümerie Douglas is an internationally operating perfumery chain. Its headquarters are located in Düsseldorf, Germany. Parfümerie Douglas was part of the Douglas Holding, but since 1 June 2015, 85 percent belong to the financial investor CVC Capital Partners and 15 percent to the Kreke family. The first perfumery to carry the name "Parfümerie Douglas" opened in Hamburg in 1910. With over 2,000 stores in Europe and turnover of 3.1 billion Euros (fiscal year 2020/21) Douglas is the market leader in Europe.

History 

The name of the company can be traced back to the Scottish soap manufacturer John Sharp Douglas. He came from a small village near Glasgow and on 5 January 1821, he founded a soap factory in Hamburg's warehouse district. The factory was soon included to the "Hamburger Address Book" as "J.S. Douglas, Engl. Soap factory, Kehrweider, Herbst Hof". On 5 November 1828, Hamburg granted John Sharp Douglas citizenship as number 663 of the Civil Protocol. Two years later, on 23 July 1830, Douglas married the mother of his six children, Johanna Catharina Francisca Becker.

Douglas's soap products, such as the Coconut Oil Soda Soap developed in 1830 and the Chinese Heavenly Soap introduced around 1840 quickly turned into success. Thanks to modern manufacturing processes, Douglas benefited from greater production efficiency.  Soap became a much more affordable product to a wider range of the public and bathing became a normal thing to do.

Douglas died in 1847 and his sons Thomas and Alexander took over the business under the name "J.S. Douglas Sons". In 1851, they presented their soap products at the first World Fair in London, where the "Chinese Heavenly Soap" was honored with a medal. In the same year, the brothers developed their "Egyptian Toilette Soap".

In September 1878, Thomas and Alexander Douglas separated as business partners and sold the company to merchants Gustav Adolph Heinrich Runge and Johan Adolph Kolbe. The new owners kept the company's name "J.S. Douglas Sons" and expanded the assortment to leather goods, travel utensils and fashion items, which they called "Fantasy Products".  In 1888, Gustav Adolph Kolbe took over the position of his deceased father, Johann Adolph, and two years later became the sole owner of the company. By proxy in 1909, he handed responsibility of the soap factory to his wife Berta.

The first Douglas Perfumeries 
Berta Kolbe was the first woman to take over the management of J.S Douglas Sons. She received a business offer from Anna and Maria Carstens: the sisters wanted to open their own perfumery under the established name of "Douglas"  to "establish and operate a business in soaps, perfumery products, and toiletries in Hamburg."  And so, on 24 May 1910, the first "Parfümerie Douglas" opened on Hamburg's shopping street Neuer Wall, and even exists today.

In 1929, the Carsten sisters passed the business on to their goddaughters Hertha and Lucie and their father, German artist Johannes Harders. As of 1931, the company was called "Parfümerie Douglas Harders & Co." and thus, reflected the new ownership structure. In 1936, the family hired Erhard Hunger to run the business. He reduced the soap business and expanded the assortment to premium brand products like Elizabeth Arden. By 1969, Erhard Hunger had expanded Douglas to six stores in Hamburg.

From perfumery to corporation 
In 1969, the six Douglas perfumeries were taken over by the then listed Hussel AG. Under the management of Hussel's chief executive at the time, John Kreke, Hussel AG fueled the expansion of the perfumery through more takeovers and store openings. These were initially consolidated under the name Hanhausen-Douglas GmbH. In the course of this development, Hussel AG was restructured into a holding group with two operating companies: one for confectionery and one for perfumeries. In 1973, Hanhausen-Douglas took over the Austrian chain Ruttner. As of 1976, all perfumery stores eventually operated under the name "Parfümerie Douglas" and the associated company under the name "Parfümerie Douglas GmbH".

Growth in Europe 
During the 1980s, the Parfümerie Douglas GmbH expanded to the Netherlands, France, Italy and the United States. And, Douglas continued to expand in Germany, for example through the acquisition of "Er & Sie" perfumeries. Based on this development in the perfumery business, an organizational restructuring took place that ended in 1989 with the founding of the Douglas Holding AG to replace the Hussel Holding AG.

After the fall of the Berlin Wall, Douglas opened stores in eastern Germany in the 90's and expanded into Switzerland, Spain and Portugal. Since the start of the new millennium, Douglas has expanded to Poland, Hungary, Monaco, Slovakia, the Czech Republic, Latvia, Lithuania, Estonia, Romania, Bulgaria, Turkey, Denmark and Croatia. Next to stationary retail, Douglas has also been selling its products via its own online shop since 2000.

At the annual general meeting in June 2001, Dr. Jörn Kreke handed over the chairmanship of the Douglas Holding to his son Dr. Henning Kreke after 32 years in the top position.

Due in part to the economic crisis and a low market share, the company withdrew from Slovakia, Estonia and Denmark in 2009/10 as well as from the American market.

Takeover by financial investor 
In 2012, the Kreke family, together with the private equity investor Advent International, made a public takeover offer to the remaining shareholders of the listed parent company of the Douglas Group, Douglas Holding AG, which at that time also included the companies Thalia, Christ, AppelrathCüpper and Hussel.  After the successful takeover in 2013, Douglas de-listed from the Frankfurt stock exchange. This marked the beginning of the conglomerate's reorientation, which went back to being purely a perfumery chain in 2014.

After that, Douglas continued to grow internationally and acquired the French perfumery chain Nocibé.

Change of ownership and strategic realignment 
At first, a renewed stock market launch for the Parfümerie Douglas Deutschland was planned for 2015. However, on 1 June 2015, 85 percent of the company was sold to financial investor CVC Capital Partners with the Kreke family still holding a minority share of 15 percent.

Then, manager Isabelle Parize took over as CEO of Douglas in February 2016 and the headquarters was moved in October from Hagen to Düsseldorf. According to Douglas, the company wanted all customer-oriented departments and the online activities from Cologne to be concentrated in one place. In the same year, the company withdrew from Turkey due to a small market share.

In July 2017, Douglas completed a transaction to acquire the Spanish perfumery chain Bodybell. In November, the company also completed transactions to acquire the Spanish chain Perfumerías If and the Italian perfumery chains Limoni and La Gardenia.

In November 2017, Tina Müller took over as the Group CEO of Douglas. In October 2022 it was announced that from November 2022 onwards, Sander van der Laan will succeed Tina Müller as CEO with Tina Müller joining the Supervisory Board of Douglas.

References 

Retail companies of Germany
Retail companies established in 1910
Companies based in North Rhine-Westphalia
German brands